Hellenic is a synonym for Greek.  It means either:
of or pertaining to the Hellenic Republic (modern Greece) or Greek people (Hellenes) and culture
of or pertaining to ancient Greece, ancient Greek people, culture and civilization.

It may also refer to:
 Hellenic Academy, an independent high school in Harare, Zimbabwe
 Hellenic Airlines
 Hellenic College, a liberal arts college in Brookline, Massachusetts
 Hellenic College of London
 Hellenic Conservatory
 Hellenic FC, a football club in South Africa
 Hellenic Football League, an association football league in England
 Hellenic languages, a branch of the Indo-European languages
 Hellenic Parliament
 Hellenic Petroleum (company)
 Hellenic Post
 Hellenic Republic Asset Development Fund
 Hellenic studies
 Tampa Bay Hellenic, a women's soccer team in the United States
 Hellenic (horse) (1987–2011), a thoroughbred racehorse

See also
 Greek (disambiguation)
 Helladic period, the Bronze Age in mainland Greece
 Hellas (disambiguation)
 Hellen, the eponymous ancestor of the Hellenes
 Hellene
 Hellenism (disambiguation)
 Hellenistic period, about 323 BC to 31 BC
 Hellenization